Rasvar (Cyrillic: Расвар) is a village in the municipality of Konjic, Bosnia and Herzegovina.

Demographics 
According to the 2013 census, its population was nil, the same as it was in 1991.

References

Populated places in Konjic